Big Music is the second studio album from Australian synthpop band Machinations. The album was released in June 1985 and peaked at number 20 on the Kent Music Report.

Background and Reception

Big Music is produced by Julian Mendelsohn who first worked with the band on the single "No Say in It" and who has worked with such British acts as Frankie Goes to Hollywood, Nik Kershaw and Art of Noise. Band member Fred Lonergan said "He was really great to work with [and] we wanted to record the album in November (of 1984) but after working with Julian we decided we would try and get him back out again. March (of 1984) was the earliest we could do it." Lonergan said "Variety is the keyword with this album. On the album we've got a reggae track, a ballad [and] a few dance tracks."

Australian musicologist, Ian McFarlane, declared that the group "[emerged] with the smoothest and most fully realised album of [their] career".

Track listing

Charts

References

1985 albums
Machinations (band) albums
Mushroom Records albums